Luis Jiménez Guevara (born 21 January 1962) is a Venezuelan former basketball player who competed in the 1992 Summer Olympics.

References

1962 births
Living people
Venezuelan men's basketball players
1990 FIBA World Championship players
Trotamundos B.B.C. players
Olympic basketball players of Venezuela
Basketball players at the 1992 Summer Olympics
20th-century Venezuelan people
21st-century Venezuelan people